Salticus coronatus is a species of spider in the family Salticidae endemic to Madagascar.

References

Salticidae
Spiders of Madagascar
Spiders described in 1887